Christine Moore is an American television director. She has directed episodes of The Wire, Treme, CSI: NY, and other television series.

Biography

Filmography

Television
Director

References

External links
 

American television directors
American women television directors
Living people
Place of birth missing (living people)
Year of birth missing (living people)